The Rodman Octagonal Barn near Edgeley, North Dakota was built in about 1890 by Luman B. Rodman.  It was listed on the National Register of Historic Places in 1986.

The building has an unusual roof which includes hay dormers.

References

Barns on the National Register of Historic Places in North Dakota
Infrastructure completed in 1890
Round barns in North Dakota
National Register of Historic Places in LaMoure County, North Dakota
Octagonal buildings in the United States
1890 establishments in North Dakota